The Enz (also: Enzbach) is a , orographically right-hand tributary of the Prüm in the Eifel mountains of Germany.

Geography 
Its source region is on the Arzfeld Plateau (Arzfelder Hochfläche). Continuing in a south-southwesterly direction, it flows through Arzfeld. At the Arzfeld Mill (Arzfeldermühle), the Enz is impounded to form a small pond. Roughly below the mill the Enz heads southwards, forming the municipal boundary between Kickeshausen and Arzfeld, and then, further south, between Jucken und Emmelbaum. This is the start of the Neuerburg Enz Valley (Neuerburger Enztal). On its way to Neuerburg, the Enz now turns in a southeasterly direction. After passing the villages of Enztalhof, Engelsdorf, Zweifelscheid, Weidendell and Beyerhof, the Enz reaches the village of In der Enz, where the Wahlbach joins it from the right.

A little later, the Enz reaches Neuerburg. By the old mill, the waters of the Enz flow over a waterfall. Below the fall, the Enz continues heading southeast making several bends. After passing Daudistel the Enz crosses the municipal boundary into Sinspelt. Continuing southeast the Enz passes Mettendorf, Enzen and Schankweiler.

On its  route the Enz drops through a height of 355 metres, which gives an average riverbed gradient of 9.4 per mille.

Tributaries 
Numerous, mostly short, tributaries flow into the Enz from the uplands. Its most important tributary is the  Radenbach. The following table gives details of the tributaries according to the water management authorities of the state of Rhineland-Palatinate.

Environment 
From its source to its confluence with the Radenbach, the Enz has among the highest concentration of coarse material and silicates of streams in the German Central Uplands (Type 5) and below the confluence has one of the highest concentrations of fine to coarse silicates (Type 9).
Its water quality is recorded as slightly contaminated downstream of Arzfeld. In the section from Neurath to Neuerburg, its water quality is moderately polluted and from Neuerburg to its mouth it is assessed as slightly polluted.

Transport routes 

The old railway line from Pronsfeld via Arzfeld to Neuerburg (Enz Valley Railway), a branch line of the West Eifel Railway, runs through the upper valley of the Enz. After its closure in 1989, the tracks were lifted and sections of the trackbed were converted into a cycleway. Since late 2011, the cycle path from Pronsfeld to Neuerburg has been completely tarmacked.

See also 
List of rivers of Rhineland-Palatinate

References 

Rivers of Rhineland-Palatinate
Rivers of the Eifel
Bitburg-Prüm
Rivers of Germany